Pitthea trifasciata  is a moth of the family Geometridae first described by Hermann Dewitz in 1881.

Distribution
It is found in Kenya, Niger, Uganda, Zimbabwe and Tanzania.

References

Dewitz (1881). "Afrikanische Nachtschmetterlinge". Nova Acta Leopoldina. Bd. 42, no. 2.

External links
"Pitthea trifasciata Dewitz, 1881". African Moths. With images and a distribution map.
 With images.

Ennominae
Moths of Africa
Moths described in 1881